"Aurum 1006 km powered by Hankook" formerly known as "ENEOS 1006 km powered by Hankook", "ENEOS 1006 km lenktynės", "Horn Grand Prix", "TV3 1003 kilometrų lenktynės" and "Omnitel 1000 km lenktynės" (for sponsorship reasons) is a touring car and GT endurance racing event held annually in Lithuania, at Palanga circuit, two kilometers away from the resort town of Palanga. The race was first held in 2000.

History

1000 km lenktynės at Palanga Circuit, then known as "Horn Grand Prix", was first held in 2000. A total of 18 teams entered the race. It was won by Vytautas Venskūnas, Vladas Laurinavičius, and Eugenijus Tumalevičius. In 2004, the number of participants increased to 34, in 2005 to 37. In the same year, the race distance was increased to 1003 km to honor new title sponsor TV3, and the race was renamed to TV3 "1003 kilometrų lenktynės".

The number of participants continued to increase in the following year as the race was officially included in the list of FIA sanctioned events and the race began to attract teams and race drivers from other countries. In 2006 41 teams entered the race and in 2007 the number of participants increased to maximum 60.

In 2008 total 75 teams submitted their entries, but only 60 entered the race, as other teams, who failed to qualify, had to compete in support 100 laps race. A new title sponsor was introduced in 2008, as Omnitel replaced TV3. Therefore, the race reverted to its original 1000 km format. Omnitel pulled off its support before 2013 edition of the race, and the race became known simply as "1000 kilometrų lenktynės" until ENEOS became a title sponsor in 2015.

In 2017 race organizers introduced a Hankook as mandatory tyre, and it also became one of the race sponsors and race name was renamed to: "ENEOS 1006 km powered by Hankook", and in 2018 race was renamed again when the main sponsor entered and the event became - "Aurum 1006 km powered by Hankook".

Classes

Touring cars, GT and prototypes can enter the race if they comply with technical regulations of the race. Open top cars, such as Radical SR8, were banned from the race after the 2014 event due to safety reasons. From 2019 class system where changed: cars that satisfy Technical Regulations and are not faster than FIA GT3 will be classified and divided into classes according to the Technical regulations of the Event.

Winners of 1000 kilometrų lenktynės

Individual race history

2010
2010 Omnitel 1000 kilometrų lenktynės was an 11th installment of 1000 kilometrų lenktynės. It was held on July 15–17, 2010.

The race was won by Steve Vanbellingen, Benny Smets and Ward Sluys from Belgium with BMW M3 Silhouette, who drove for KS Motorsport team. Oktanas Racing drivers Robertas Kupčikas, Nemunas Dagilis and Nerijus Dagilis finished second with Porsche 997 GT3, two laps down. Fuchs MP Sport Star Moto team's drivers Maciej Marcinkewicz, Maciej Stanco and Pawel Potocki finished third with Ferrari F430 GT3 Scuderia, 15 laps down.

Only 34 cars from 42 finished the race. Fastest lap was recorded by Robertas Kupčikas, with a laptime of 1.21:032.

2012
2012 Omnitel 1000 kilometrų lenktynės was the 13th installment of 1000 kilometrų lenktynės. It was held on July 19–21, 2012.

The race was won by South Africans Sun Moodley, Andrew Culbert and Manogh Maharaj, who drove Porsche 911 GT3 Cup for Oktanas Racing, despite running out of fuel in the final lap. JR Motorsport team drivers took second with BMW M3 Silhouette. RIMO team with BMW 3 Series finished third and also took victory in diesel-powered cars class.

Race favourites BOD-Bauer Racing took pole position with a laptime of 1:30.204, but soon after the start their Aquila CR1 developed a brakes issue and finished only in 28th position. During the race weekend team also set the fastest Palanga Circuit laptime of 1:17.270, which is still the best lap time on the old configuration circuit.

2014
2014 1000 kilometrų lenktynės was the 15th installment of 1000 kilometrų lenktynės. It was held on July 17–19, 2014. This was the first time when the race was held in shortened circuit. This was also the second time in a row when the race did not have a title sponsor after Omnitel pulled off its support in 2013.

The race was red flagged for the first time in history due to heavy rain after 303 laps from 373. Victory was awarded to Liqui Moly Racing Team Lithuania and its drivers Jonas Gelžinis, Ignas Gelžinis and Edvinas Arkušauskas with BMW M3. "INTER RAO Lietuva" finished second, 13 seconds behind with another BMW M3. Final podium position was taken by "Macrofinance" racing team with third BMW M3.

Qualification was dominated by sports car drivers. Speed Factory Racing driver Konstantin Calko with Radical SR8 took pole position with a laptime of 1:07.046. "15min-GSR-Telsiu statyba" with Radical SR5 was second, 2.344 seconds behind. BarBar'a-Bauer by Algirdai took third, 2.892 behind, but due to technical problems they all finished outside the top 10.

External links
Official website

References

Motorsport in Lithuania
Endurance motor racing
Touring car racing
Sport in Palanga